Brock Jensen (born September 19, 1990) is a former Canadian football quarterback. He played college football at North Dakota State, a member of the Missouri Valley Football Conference. He led the North Dakota State Bison to three consecutive national championships (2011–2013). He finished 4th in the 2013 Walter Payton Award Voting.

Professional career

Miami Dolphins
Jensen signed with the Miami Dolphins of the National Football League (NFL) as an undrafted free agent following the 2014 NFL Draft; he was released on July 28, 2014. On August 5, 2014, Jensen re-signed with the Dolphins after a shoulder injury to quarterback Matt Moore, and was again released August 11, 2014.

Ottawa Redblacks
Jensen saw his first CFL regular-season action on July 22, 2016, following an injury to Trevor Harris, completing 20 of 29 pass attempts for 271 yards and two touchdowns against the Saskatchewan Roughriders. He made his first career start in Week 20 of the 2016 season as Ottawa had already clinched a playoff spot and were resting some of their starters. Jensen was released, along with 6 other players, on June 5, 2017 during training camp for the 2017 season.

CFL career statistics

Regular season

References

External links
Miami Dolphins bio
North Dakota State Bison football bio
Ottawa Redblacks bio

1990 births
Living people
American football quarterbacks
North Dakota State Bison football players
Miami Dolphins players
People from Waupaca, Wisconsin
Players of American football from Wisconsin
Omaha Mammoths players
Ottawa Redblacks players
Canadian football quarterbacks
American players of Canadian football